Jan Khani (also Romanized as Jān Khānī; also known as Jahān Khānī, Qeyām, and Qīām) is a village in Olya Tayeb Rural District, in the Central District of Landeh County, Kohgiluyeh and Boyer-Ahmad Province, Iran. At the 2006 census, its population was 862, in 164 families.

References 

Populated places in Landeh County